Vitus Husek (later known as Vitus Gesser, born 2 February 1973 in Augsburg) is a German slalom canoeist who competed at the international level from 1990 to 2000.

He won a gold medal in the C1 team event at the 1995 ICF Canoe Slalom World Championships in Nottingham and at the 1996 European Championships in Augsburg. Husek also finished 12th in the C1 event at the 1996 Summer Olympics in Atlanta.

World Cup individual podiums

References

1973 births
Canoeists at the 1996 Summer Olympics
German male canoeists
Living people
Olympic canoeists of Germany
Sportspeople from Augsburg
Medalists at the ICF Canoe Slalom World Championships